Ioana Crișan (born ) is a Romanian female artistic gymnast. At the 2016 European Women's Artistic Gymnastics Championships she won the bronze medal with the Romanian team.

Competitive history

References

2001 births
Living people
Romanian female artistic gymnasts
21st-century Romanian women